The Czech Republic competed at the 2020 Summer Olympics in Tokyo. Originally scheduled to take place from 24 July to 9 August 2020, the Games were postponed to 23 July to 8 August 2021, because of the COVID-19 pandemic. It was the nation's seventh consecutive appearance at the Summer Olympics after splitting from the former Czechoslovakia.

Several team members, including table tennis player Pavel Širuček, beach volleyball players Ondřej Perušič and Markéta Sluková and road cyclist Michal Schlegel, and delegation members were tested positive for COVID-19 in Tokyo. The anti-epidemic measures were not followed on a charter flight of the Czech team and delegation, the case positivity of unvaccinated tennis doctor (despite wide vaccine availability in the Czech Republic) have caused most controversies.

For the Czech Republic, these were the most successful Olympic Games in terms of medals. Czech athletes broke the previous record from the Olympics in 1996 and 2012 by one silver medal.

Medalists

Competitors
The following is the list of number of competitors participating in the Games:

Archery

One Czech Republic archer directly qualified for the women's individual recurve at the Games by reaching the semifinal stage and obtaining one of five available spots at the 2021 Final Qualification Tournament in Paris, France.

Athletics

Czech athletes further achieved the entry standards, either by qualifying time or by world ranking, in the following track and field events (up to a maximum of 3 athletes in each event):

Track & road events
Men

Women

Field events
Men

Women

Combined events - Men's decathlon

Basketball

Men's tournament 

The Czech Republic men's basketball team qualified for the Olympics by winning the Olympic Qualifying Tournament in Victoria.

Team roster

Group play

Canoeing

Slalom
Czech canoeists qualified boats in all four classes for the Games through the 2019 ICF Canoe Slalom World Championships in La Seu d'Urgell, Spain.

Sprint
Czech canoeists qualified four boats in each of the following distances for the Games through the 2019 ICF Canoe Sprint World Championships in Szeged, Hungary.

Qualification Legend: FA = Qualify to final (medal); FB = Qualify to final B (non-medal)

Cycling

Road
Czech Republic entered a squad of four riders (three men and one woman) to compete in their respective Olympic road races, by virtue of their top 50 national finish (for men) and her top 100 individual finish (for women) in the UCI World Ranking.

Track
Following the completion of the 2020 UCI Track Cycling World Championships, Czech Republic entered one rider to compete in the men's sprint and keirin based on his final individual UCI Olympic rankings.

Sprint

Keirin

Mountain biking
Czech Republic qualified two mountain bikers; one male and one female, based on the UCI Olympic Mountain Biking rankings.

Equestrian

Czech Republic entered two eventing riders into the Olympic equestrian competition by securing the first and fifth of six available slots, respectively, outside the group and continental selection, in the individual FEI Olympic rankings. Meanwhile, a squad of three jumping riders was added to the Czech roster by accepting a forfeited spot from Ukraine, as the next highest-ranked team, not yet qualified, at the International Equestrian Federation (FEI)-designated Olympic qualifier for the second batch of Group C (Central and Eastern Europe) in Budapest.

Eventing

Jumping

Fencing

Czech Republic entered two fencers into the Olympic competition. Jakub Jurka (men's épée) and Rio 2016 Olympian Alexander Choupenitch (men's foil) claimed the fencing spots on the Czech roster as the sole winners of their respective individual events at the European Zonal Qualifier in Madrid, Spain.

Golf

Czech Republic entered one male and one female golfer into the Olympic tournament.

Gymnastics

Artistic
Czech Republic entered two artistic gymnast into the Olympic competition. Aneta Holasová booked a spot in the women's individual all-around and apparatus events, by finishing eleventh out of the twenty gymnasts eligible for qualification at the 2019 World Championships in Stuttgart, Germany.

Men

Women

Judo
 
Czech Republic entered two male judoka  into the Olympic tournament based on the International Judo Federation Olympics Individual Ranking.

Modern pentathlon
 
Czech athletes qualified for the following spots in the modern pentathlon at the Games. Martin Vlach secured his selection in the men's event with a bronze-medal finish and third among those eligible for Olympic qualification at the 2019 European Championships in Bath, England.

Rowing

Czech Republic qualified three boats for each of the following rowing classes into the Olympic regatta. Rowing crews in the men's single sculls and women's double sculls confirmed Olympic places for their boats at the 2019 FISA World Championships in Ottensheim, Austria. Meanwhile, two more crews (men's double sculls and men's lightweight double sculls) were added to the Czech roster with their top-two finish at the 2021 FISA Final Qualification Regatta in Lucerne, Switzerland.

Men

Women

Qualification Legend: FA=Final A (medal); FB=Final B (non-medal); FC=Final C (non-medal); FD=Final D (non-medal); FE=Final E (non-medal); FF=Final F (non-medal); SA/B=Semifinals A/B; SC/D=Semifinals C/D; SE/F=Semifinals E/F; QF=Quarterfinals; R=Repechage

Sailing

Czech sailors qualified one boat in each of the following classes through the class-associated World Championships and the continental regattas.

M = Medal race; EL = Eliminated – did not advance into the medal race

Shooting

Czech shooters achieved quota places for the following events by virtue of their best finishes at the 2018 ISSF World Championships, the 2019 ISSF World Cup series, European Championships or Games, and European Qualifying Tournament, as long as they obtained a minimum qualifying score (MQS) by 31 May 2020.

Men

Women

Mixed

Sport climbing

Czech Republic entered one sport climber into the Olympic tournament. Multiple bouldering and lead world champion Adam Ondra qualified directly for the men's combined event, by advancing to the final and securing the first of the six provisional berths at the IFSC World Olympic Qualifying Event in Toulouse, France.

Swimming 

Czech swimmers further achieved qualifying standards in the following events (up to a maximum of 2 swimmers in each event at the Olympic Qualifying Time (OQT), and potentially 1 at the Olympic Selection Time (OST)):

Men

Women

Table tennis

Czech Republic entered three athletes into the table tennis competition at the Games. Rio 2016 Olympian Lubomír Jančařík scored a first-match final triumph to book one of the four available places in the men's singles at the 2021 ITTF World Qualification Tournament in Doha, Qatar. Meanwhile, Pavel Širuček reserved the last of the five Olympic slots available in the men's singles through a repechage play-off at the European Qualification Tournament in Odivelas, Portugal, thereby joining Jančarík on the country's roster for his maiden Games. On the women's side, Hana Matelová secured a singles spot as one of the top-ten table tennis players vying for qualification in the ITTF Olympic Rankings of June 1, 2021.

Tennis

Men

Women

Triathlon
 
The Czech Republic has entered two triathletes to compete at the Games.

Volleyball

Beach
Czech Republic men's and women's beach volleyball teams qualified directly for the Olympics by virtue of their nation's top 15 placement in the FIVB Olympic Rankings of 13 June 2021.

Note  Because of COVID-19 regulations, Barbora Hermannová and Markéta Sluková were unable to play three matches in the women's beach volleyball tournament, with Ondřej Perušič and David Schweiner missing a single match on the men's side. According to the beach volleyball rules, both Czech teams were awarded a direct defeat and single point, while their opponents received two points and a walkover win.

Weightlifting

Czech Republic weightlifters qualified for one quota places at the games, based on the Tokyo 2020 Rankings Qualification List of 11 June 2021.

Wrestling

Czech Republic qualified one wrestler for the men's Greco-Roman 97 kg into the Olympic competition, by progressing to the top two finals at the 2021 World Qualification Tournament in Sofia, Bulgaria.

Greco-Roman

References

Nations at the 2020 Summer Olympics
2020
2021 in Czech sport